Scipione affricano (Scipio Africanus) is an opera in a prologue and three acts by Francesco Cavalli. It was designated as a dramma per musica. The Italian libretto was by Nicolò Minato, based on Livy's "The Continence of Scipio".

Performance history
It was first performed in Venice at the Teatro SS. Giovanni e Paolo on 9 February 1664. It was also given in Rome in 1671 with the castrato Giovanni Francesco Grossi as a celebrated Siface. Giovanni Buonaventura Viviani produced a greatly revised version of the opera for the Carnival of Venice in 1678.

Roles

References

Further reading
Clinkscale, Martha Novak, "Scipione affricano", The New Grove Dictionary of Opera, ed. Stanley Sadie (London, 1992) 

Italian-language operas
Operas by Francesco Cavalli
1664 operas
Operas set in ancient Rome
Operas